Potamomusa midas is a moth in the family Crambidae. It was described by Arthur Gardiner Butler in 1881. It is found in Japan (Honshu, Shikoku, Kyushu, Yakushima Islands), China (south to Hubei), the Russian Far East (Amur, Ussuri) and Korea.

The length of the forewings is 8.2–9.7 mm for males and 9.1–14 mm for females.

Full-grown larvae reach a length of 20–34 mm. They have a whitish body and a blackish head with pale spots.

References

Acentropinae
Moths described in 1881